Pelicope is a genus of braconid wasps in the family Braconidae. There is at least one described species in Pelicope, P. yuccamica, found in California.

References

Further reading

 
 
 

Microgastrinae